Wiebe is a German (language) surname. It is from a short form of any various Ancient Germanic personal names beginning with wig, "battle", "war".

List of people
 Adam Wiebe (–1653), Dutch engineer
 Alejandro Wiebe (born 1970), Argentine television personality
 Armin Wiebe (born 1948), Canadian novelist
 Art Wiebe (1912-1971), Canadian ice hockey player
 Cainan Wiebe (born 1995), Canadian actor
 Cornelius Wiebe (1893-1999), Canadian physician
 Ella Wiebe (born 1978), New Zealand association footballer
 Erica Wiebe (born 1989) Canadian Olympic gold medal wrestler
 Jack Wiebe (1936–2007), Canadian politician
 Katie Funk Wiebe (1924-2016), Canadian-American writer
 Mark Wiebe (born 1957), American golfer
 Mike Wiebe, American musician (The Riverboat Gamblers), actor, stand-up comedian
 Matt Wiebe (born 1979), Canadian politician
 Nettie Wiebe (born 1949), Canadian professor
 Phillip H. Wiebe (born 1945), Canadian philosopher
 Randall Wiebe (20th century–21st century), Canadian playwright
 Reg Wiebe (1963–2018), Canadian-born Dutch curler
 Robert Wiebe (born 1937), Canadian politician
 Rudy Wiebe (born 1934), Canadian author
 Shane Wiebe (born 1983), Canadian musician
 Steve Wiebe (born 1969), American video game player, school teacher, and musician who formerly held a high score record in Donkey Kong
 Warren Wiebe (1953-1998), American vocalist

References

Russian Mennonite surnames